Charles Benjamin Tayler  (1797–1875) was a Church of England clergyman and writer for the young.

The son of John Tayler, he was born at Leytonstone, Essex, 16 Sep. 1797 and baptised at St Botolph Bishopsgate 11 Nov. following. He was educated at Guildford under the Rev. William Hodgson Cole, and entered Trinity College, Cambridge, as a fellow commoner on 23 Oct. 1815, graduating B.A. in 1819 and M.A. in 1822.

Taking holy orders, he was licensed to a curacy at Hadleigh in Suffolk in 1821, where he adopted strong Protestant views and a rooted antipathy to Roman Catholicism. He left Hadleigh in 1826, and successively served, each for a short time, curacies in Kent, in Surrey, and in Hampshire. From 1831 to 1836 he had the sole charge of the parish of Hodnet in Shropshire. In 1836 John Bird Sumner, bishop of Chester, presented him to the living of St. Peter's in Chester, where he was also evening lecturer at St. Mary's, a large church in which he usually preached to twelve hundred persons. While at Chester he published from 1838 a series of Tracts for the Rich. In 1846 he was appointed rector of Otley in Suffolk, which he resigned shortly before his death. Here he specially laboured among the young.

He died at Worthing on 16 Oct. 1875. While at Otley, he married, Aldine, daughter of A.D. Lewis Agassiz of Finsbury Square, London.

Works
His numerous books and tracts consisted either of warnings against the errors of the Catholics, or of manuals of religious instruction for the young. The chief were: 
The Child of the Church of England (1834; new edit. 1852)
Facts in a Clergyman's Life (1849)
Sermons for all Seasons (1850)
Memorials of the English Martyrs (1853)
Legends and Records, chiefly historical (1854)
The Tongue of the Swearer: a Suffolk Story (1861)
The Race Course and its Accompaniments (1867)
Found at Eventide: the true Story of a young Village Infidel (1870)
Sacred Records in Verse (1872).

References

Attribution

External links
 
 
 Archival material at 

1797 births
1875 deaths
People from Leytonstone
Alumni of Trinity College, Cambridge
19th-century English Anglican priests